Beijing Yintai Centre Tower 2 is a 63-floor 250 meter (820 foot) tall skyscraper completed in 2007 located in Beijing Yintai Centre, Beijing, China.  It includes a hotel and residences.

See also

 List of tallest buildings in Beijing

References

External links

Skyscrapers in Beijing
John C. Portman Jr. buildings
Skyscraper hotels in Beijing
Residential skyscrapers in China